Tam Fiofori (born 1942), also known as "Uncle Tam", is a Nigerian documentary photographer. Notable for his albums chronicling Nigeria's history, Fiofori is also a filmmaker, writer, critic and media consultant. The subjects of his films include the Nigerian artists Biodun Olaku, J. D. 'Okhai Ojeikere and Olu Amoda. Much travelled, Fiofori lived in Harlem, New York, in the 1960s, becoming Sun Ra's manager, and producing writing that is considered "a founding connection between Ra and the movement that would be known as Afrofuturism".

Early life and education
Born in Okrika in Rivers State, Fiofori grew up in Benin City, where his father, Emmanuel Fiofori, taught at Edo College.

Fiofori was educated at King's College, Lagos, going on to university studies at King's College London, before turning his attention to writing and music.

Career
Travelling extensively since the 1960s, Fiofori became an associate in the US of Sun Ra. According to the Pan African Space Station, "Uncle Tam later invited Sun Ra to Lagos for FESTAC 77, took him to the Kalakuta Republic . . .  and wrote about it all in the Nigerian journal Glendora Review."

Fiofori was the first New Music/Electronic Music Editor for DownBeat, and wrote for many other art and literary publications in the US and Europe — among them International Times and Change magazine — and has been credited with being "largely responsible for bringing underground black creativity to the American national consciousness in those heady days of the 1970s". His writing has been regularly published over the years in a range of Nigerian outlets, including NEXT newspaper, and the blog Shèkèrè.

Fiofori was a film consultant to Rivers State Council for Arts and Culture, the director of Rivers State Documentary Series, and consultant/scriptwriter to NTA Network on Documentaries. He was also founding executive of the Photographers' Association of Nigeria (PAN).

His work has been shown in Africa, Europe and the US, including Odum and Water Masquerades (1974), screened at FESTAC '77, Tampere Film Festival, 10th FESPACO, Ouagadougou, 1987, Pan African Writers' Association, Accra, Ghana, and 1979: A Peep into History and Culture.

His publications include the "print documentary" A Benin Coronation: Oba Erediauwa (2011). As described by the author: "The book's journalistic format has technically provided for 84 pages of photography featuring about 150 original photographs, accompanied by 72 pages of text; all about the Benin City Coronation ceremonies of Oba Erediauwa as the 38th Oba of the Benin Kingdom, from March 23 to 30, 1979." Nigeria's Guardian newspaper judged that Fiofori "paints a poetically enchanting picture", and said: "The author undertakes a very insightful rendering of the dynasties of the Benin Kingdom and gives an elaborate account of the 45-year reign of Oba Akenzua II which started on April 5, 1933.... Tam Fiofori has through his groundbreaking book, A Benin Coronation: Oba Erediauwa, given Nigeria and the rest of the world a timeless study in lofty heritage."

He is a contributor to the 2018 book African Photographer J. A. Green: Re-imagining the Indigenous and the Colonial (edited by Martha G. Anderson and Lisa Aronson), in a review of which Lindsay Barrett referred to Fiofori as "Nigeria’s iconic photographic genius".

Awards
Among honours Fiofori has received are awards from the Pan African Writers' Association (PAWA), iRepresent International Documentary Film Festival, and Music in Africa.

Films
 Odum and Water Masquerades, 1974
 Biodun Olaku: Nigerian Painter
 J. D. ‘Okhai Ojeikere: Master Photographer
 Olu Amoda: A Metallic Journey, 2015 (60 mins)

Exhibitions
 2006/7: Bayelsa @ 10. Yenagoa, Abuja.
 2010: 1979: A Peep into History and Culture. Oba's Palace, Benin City; Hexagon, Benin City

See also
 List of Nigerian film producers

References

External links
 Tam Fiofori's Place
 Tam Fiofori at Artslant magazine

Living people
1942 births
20th-century photographers
21st-century photographers
Alumni of King's College London

Film directors from Rivers State
King's College, Lagos alumni
Nigerian film critics
Nigerian film directors
Nigerian journalists
Nigerian photographers
People from Benin City
People from Okrika
Writers from Rivers State